Akhmed Dogayev (born August 18, 1965, Belorechie, Checheno-Ingush Autonomous Soviet Socialist Republic) is a Russian political figure and a deputy the 7th and 8th State Dumas. From 2013 to 2016, he headed the representation of the Head of the Chechen Republic in the Southern Federal District. In 2015, he was elected chairman of the council of representatives of the head of the Chechen Republic in the constituent entities of the Russian Federation. 

In 2016 he ran for the 7th State Duma from the Chechnya constituency, but was not elected. However, on September 28, 2016,  he received the mandate from Ramzan Kadyrov who won the Chechen head election and, thus, declined the offer to join the State Duma. In 2021, Dogaev took 348 out of 434 places in the so-called Ranking of the Deputies' Usefulness; he received zero points for his lack of participation in the discussions. In September 2021, Akhmed Dogayev was re-elected as a deputy of the 8th State Duma. 
Akhmed Dogayev is married and has four daughters. 

On 24 March 2022, the United States Treasury sanctioned him in response to the 2022 Russian invasion of Ukraine.

References

1965 births
Living people
United Russia politicians
21st-century Russian politicians
Eighth convocation members of the State Duma (Russian Federation)
Seventh convocation members of the State Duma (Russian Federation)
Russian individuals subject to the U.S. Department of the Treasury sanctions